Max Morrow is a Canadian former actor. He is best known for his roles in Connor Undercover as the title character, Monk as Benjy Fleming, The Christmas Shoes, Sister Mary Explains It All, and The Great Goose Caper.

Filmography

Movies

Television

External links

Canadian male child actors
Canadian male film actors
Canadian male television actors
Canadian male voice actors
Living people
1991 births